Kishajmás is a village in Hegyhát District, northern Baranya county, in the Southern Transdanubia region of Hungary. Its population at the 2011 census was 209.

Geography 
It is part of the Southern Transdanubia statistical region, and administratively it falls under Baranya County and Hegyhát District.

Demographics

2011 census 
As of the census of 2011, there were 209 residents, 82 households, and 52 families living in the village. The population density was 46 inhabitants per square mile (18/km2). There were 93 dwellings at an average density of 20 per square mile (8/km2). The average household size was 2.54. The average number of children was 1.42. The average family size was 3.23.

Religious affiliation was 55.8% Roman Catholic, 5.8% Calvinist, 0.5% Lutheran, 0.5% other religion and 13.5% unaffiliated, with 24.0% declining to answer.

The village had an ethnic minority Roma population of 10.6%. A small number of residents also identified as German (0.5%). The majority declared themselves as Hungarian (87.0%), with 13.0% declining to answer.

Local government 
The village is governed by a mayor with a four-person council. The local government of the village operates a joint council office with the nearby localities of Bakóca, Baranyajenő, Kisbeszterce, Mindszentgodisa, Szágy, and Tormás. The seat of the joint council is in Mindszentgodisa.

Transportation

Railway 
 Szatina-Kishajmás Train Station, in the village. The station is on the Pusztaszabolcs–Pécs railway line and is operated by MÁV.

External links 
 OpenStreetMap
 Detailed Gazetteer of Hungary

Notes

References

Populated places in Baranya County